Seesaw is a 1973 American musical with a book by Michael Bennett, music by Cy Coleman, and lyrics by Dorothy Fields.

Based on the William Gibson play Two for the Seesaw, the plot focuses on a brief affair between Jerry Ryan, a young lawyer from Nebraska, and Gittel Mosca, a kooky, streetwise dancer from the Bronx. The musical numbers evoke colorful aspects of New York City life but have relatively little to do with the story. The most notable feature of the score's original orchestrations by Larry Fallon was their wide use of brass instruments.

Production history
The production faced seemingly insurmountable problems during its pre-Broadway trial, and when it reached Detroit, producers Joseph Kipness and Lawrence Kasha brought in Bennett for advice. He recommended they abandon the book by Michael Stewart and fire director Edwin Sherin and leading lady Lainie Kazan, who he felt was too hefty to portray a dancer convincingly. Upon agreeing to helm the show, Bennett recast most of the ensemble, convinced Robin Wagner to replace his original realistic design with a sleek, stylized set, had Coleman and Fields rework their score, and brought in Neil Simon to help him rewrite the book, although final credit went solely to Bennett.

The musical opened on Broadway at the Uris Theatre on March 18, 1973 and transferred to the Mark Hellinger on August 1, 1973. Between the two venues, it ran a total of 296 performances and 25 previews. The director and choreographer was Bennett, with Grover Dale as co-choreographer and associate choreographers Bob Avian and Tommy Tune. Scenic design was by Robin Wagner, costume design was by Ann Roth and lighting design and projections were by Jules Fisher. The cast included Ken Howard, Michele Lee, Tommy Tune, Giancarlo Esposito, Thommie Walsh, Amanda McBroom and Baayork Lee.

Reviews were universally good, but there was no money for newspaper ads to quote them or television spots to promote the show. As a publicity stunt, New York City Mayor John Lindsay was persuaded to appear on stage during a production number set in Times Square, and the ensuing media coverage resulted in a boost at the box office. But the move from the Uris Theatre to the Mark Hellinger Theatre was costly, and although a post-Broadway run in Philadelphia and Boston was a financial success, Seesaw failed to earn back its sizable investment. During the Broadway run, Michele Lee left the show and was replaced by actress-singer-dancer-comedian Patti Karr. Karr had been Lee's standby.

When the Broadway run ended, Lucie Arnaz, John Gavin, and Tommy Tune starred in the national tour of the musical in 1974. (Gavin played the role for seven months on Broadway 
replacing Ken Howard.)

The Equity Library Theater, New York City, presented the musical in 1981. This production featured Karen Ziemba, Bill Tatum, Richard Ruth, Thom Warren and Diana Schlossberg. Used in this production as the Act 1 closer was "The Party's on Me', a song used in the National Tour. The New York Times reviewer noted that this "was less a musical than a play, less a play than a musical, and not enough of either. The saving grace, to the extent that there was any, was the choreography by Mr. Bennett (who also served as director and partial librettist) and the high point of the production was Tommy Tune's long-legged, high-kicking dance up a set of stairs on a stage filled with balloons. Under the circumstances, this is not a musical that lends itself very well to revival, because its original merits depended so much on the individuals involved in the Broadway presentation."

The J2 Spotlight Musical Theatre Company, founded by Jim Jimirro (Executive Producer) and Robert W. Schneider (Artistic Director), presented an Off-Broadway revival as part of its inaugural season. The production opened on February 13, 2020 at Theatre Row. Directed by Robert W. Schneider, the production starred Stephanie Israelson as Gittel Mosca, Andy Tighe as Jerry Ryan and J. Savage as David.

Songs

Act I     
 Seesaw
 My City
 Nobody Does It Like Me
 In Tune
 Spanglish
 Welcome to Holiday Inn!
 You're a Lovable Lunatic
 He's Good for Me
 Ride Out the Storm

Act II     
 We've Got It
 Poor Everybody Else
 Chapter 54, Number 1909
 The Concert
 It's Not Where You Start
 I'm Way Ahead
 Seesaw (Reprise)

Awards and nominations

Original Broadway production

Notes

References
One Singular Sensation: The Michael Bennett Story by Kevin Kelly, published by Doubleday (1990), pages 103-111

External links
 
Seesaw Story and Songs at guidetomusicaltheatre.com

1973 musicals
Broadway musicals
Musicals based on plays
Musicals by Cy Coleman
Plays set in New York City
Tony Award-winning musicals